John Chambers Berly (May 24, 1903 – June 26, 1977) was a Major League Baseball pitcher.

Berly was born in Natchitoches, Louisiana. He made his major league debut for the St. Louis Cardinals on April 22, 1924. Making four appearances, all in late relief, he gave up five runs over eight innings pitched. Berly would not return to the majors for seven seasons.

In  Berly joined the Rochester Red Wings of the Triple-A International League, then managed by Billy Southworth. The Red Wings won three straight IL pennants in 1928–, and Berly went 33–22 in those seasons, winning the IL earned run average title in 1930 (2.49).

In  the New York Giants acquired Berly. He had seven wins with eight losses in 27 games. In – he pitched for the Philadelphia Phillies, mostly in relief.

He returned to Rochester in late , just in time to play on his fourth IL pennant winner. Over 11 IL seasons he had a won-lost record of 101–84, with a 3.68 ERA in 1610 innings pitched.

Berly was inducted into the International League Hall of Fame in 1955. In 1977, he died in Houston, Texas.

References

International League Hall of Fame page

1903 births
1977 deaths
Major League Baseball pitchers
St. Louis Cardinals players
Philadelphia Phillies players
New York Giants (NL) players
Rochester Red Wings players
Toronto Maple Leafs (International League) players
Baseball players from Louisiana
Sportspeople from Natchitoches, Louisiana